As of the year 2019 there are two different valid systems of vehicle registration plates in the Czech Republic.

Format 

The latest system of Czech vehicle registration plate was introduced between 29 June and 17 July 2001. In this system, the first letter from the left represents the region (kraj), and this is combined with numbers issued in series from 1x0 0001, where x is the letter representing the region.

By 2009, Prague (A) has reached the combination 9x9 9999 in its respective series; consequently it then started issuing plates which included a two-letter combination in the format 1xa 0000 to 9xa 9999, where x is the regional letter and a is a letter in alphabetical order (so that 1AA 9999 is followed by 1AB 0000, and so on). Shortly after that the Central-Bohemian region came. As of the beginning of the summer 2014, the South Moravian (B) and Moravian-Silesian in the November, lastly in April 2019 the Usti region. Regions were also issuing registration marks with two-letter combinations.

Motorcycle plates have the 2-line format 1x 0001, where x is the letter representing the region.

Since 2004 with the accession of the Czech Republic to the European Union, a blue European strip with the letters CZ and European stars have been added.

As of 1 January 2015, registration numbers are not changed if the owner of a vehicle moves to another region or if the vehicle is re-registered to a new owner residing in a different region. New numbers (with the corresponding code of the region of re-registration) are assigned only in the case of damage, loss, or theft of a registration plate.

Since 2017 custom ("personalized") plates have been available, against payment of a special fee of 5 000 CZK (around 222 USD) per plate, i.e for a car it would cost 10 000 CZK and for a motorcycle 5 000 CZK. These have the format XXX-XXXXX (i.e. they have one more character than ordinary plates) and must contain at least one number. The letters G, CH, O, Q and W may not be used. The license plate cannot contain any abusive or offensive words.

History

1932 - 1954 

This system was introduced in Czechoslovakia in 1932. The first letters are represented by region.
Composition (newer form: 1945 - 1954):
X-NN-NNN, white on black
Composition (older form: 1932 - 1939):
X-NNNNN, black on white

1954 - 2001 

This system was introduced in Czechoslovakia in 1960. After the dissolution of Czechoslovakia, the Slovak Republic introduced a new system of car registration plates in 1997 while the Czech Republic kept issuing the old one until 2001.  In the old system, the two first letters represented the district (okres). Registrations in Prague began with A, while the vehicles used by the government had registration plates beginning with AA.

Composition (older form: 1960–1984):
XX-NN-NN or XXX-NN-NN
Composition (newer form: 1984–2001):
XX NN-NN or XXX NN-NN

(X = letters, N = numbers.)

Commercially used vehicles and heavy goods vehicle had a yellow background. Vehicles with foreign owners had a blue background and yellow letters.

List of districts

Special license plates

Diplomatic registration plates 

Until 2001 diplomatic plates (as well as those on cars owned by foreign residents) in the Czech Republic used a blue background with yellow letters. Foreigners (Czechoslovakia) used same plates as DC plates except they did not use the DD or XX codes, and non-diplomatic personnel used a XX code instead. Since 2001 the yellow on blue plates have been replaced by plates with blue letters on a white background.

Others 
Commercial vehicles of Czechoslovakia have black letters with a yellow background, military have numbers only, rentals of Czechoslovakia have red letters on a white background (discontinued), historic vehicles use green letters on a white background (always using "V" as a prefix), trailers of Czechoslovakia have the district codes put in the middle (99 XXX-99 or 99 XX-99) and technical embassies use red letters on a yellow background (discontinued).

Gallery

References

External links
 
 Diplomatic license plate
 Czech Republic license plates, pictures and images

Transport in the Czech Republic
Czech Republic
Czech Republic transport-related lists
 Registration plates